The 1936 Macdonald Brier, the Canadian men's national curling championship, was held from March 2 to 5, 1936 at the Granite Club in Toronto, Ontario. This was the first Brier in which teams from British Columbia and Prince Edward Island would participate, increasing the field from 8 to 10 teams. This arrangement remained until  when Newfoundland was added to the Brier field.

Team Manitoba, who was skipped by Ken Watson, captured the Brier Tankard with a round robin record of 8-1. This was Manitoba's seventh Brier championship overall and the first of three titles for Watson as a skip. A tiebreaker game was played to determine the runner-up as both Team Alberta and Team New Brunswick finished the round robin with 7-2 records. Alberta defeated New Brunswick 8-6 in the tiebreaker to finish runner-up.

Watson's rink also set a Brier record for most points scored in a tournament (142) which still stands as of 2022. Watson and his rink steamrolled through the competition thanks to their long slides, which caused controversy at the competition. Up until then, most curlers delivered their stones with a foot still in the hack, however the Watson rink slid out from the hack. Despite their dominance, they did not claim the Brier title until their final round robin game against New Brunswick. With both teams having identical 7–1 records at the time, the match attracted the largest Brier crowd in history up to that point. The game was fairly lacklustre, however the last end was not. Watson had to draw against three New Brunswick stones on his last rock to claim the championship.

Teams
The teams are listed as follows:

Round Robin standings

Round Robin results

Draw 1

Draw 2

Draw 3

Draw 4

Draw 5

Draw 6

Draw 7

Draw 8

Draw 9

Tiebreaker

References 

Macdonald Brier, 1936
Macdonald Brier, 1936
The Brier
Curling in Toronto
Macdonald Brier
Macdonald Brier
1930s in Toronto